Ennerdale is a town in Gauteng, South Africa. Ennerdale was declared as a coloured group area under the apartheid regime. 

According to Crankshaw (2022), 'the coloureds-only suburb of Ennerdale, which was developed later during the 1980s, was built for homeownership by the private sector and home loans were financed by private banks (Lupton, 1991: pp.20–1; 1993).'  Even though apartheid ended in 1994 people say it's a "coloured" community but it's mixed. Best known for its religious grouping, Ennerdale has more churches than business. Most young people between the age of 22 and 37 do not prefer to engage in the countries economic activities, they rather open a church.

History 

Ennerdale was established in the early 1930s as a sweet fruit farm for apricots, peaches and plums that waseant to serve the white communities of Vereeniging and Vanderbijlpark.

However due to the implementations of apartheid it was then earmarked for the people classified "coloured" which includes Malays, Cape Coloureds and other different types of Coloureds.

Ennerdale as a whole has many extensions, Extensions are 1,2,3,4,5,6,8,9,10,12 and 14,there is no reasonable explanation to why there is no extension 7, 11 and 13, of recently extension 4 also did not exist, until it was established by poor Coloureds that lost their bank owned properties, and it eventually birthed Lakeview  section.

Ennerdale is surrounded by Hopefield, Lawley 1, Lawley 2, Lawley Station, Lakeview, Kapook, Lenasia South, Meriting, Grasmere and Finetown.

The area is poor due to lack of service delivery that, and it is separated into two wards (7 and 121) which are under the ANC.

Before any settlement Ennerdale was a farm for apricots, peaches and plums around 1899 to 1935. With Governor Sir Arthur Lawley giving orders from the United Kingdom, since it was pre-Apartheid, this region was controlled by the British until 1948 with the introduction of Apartheid. 

Ennerdale is a semi-suburb and partially township which was established by a mixed white Afrikaner man by the name of Freddie Jacobus Smith from Graaff Reinet in 1940. Smith was classified 'Coloured' by the National Party government falling under the term 'Spesiale Kleurling'. 

He came this desolate tract of land to suit his needs and start his life after a failed one in Graaff Reinet, and thus one man (his friend) set out to establish Grasmere nearby. 

Smith married Marietta De Villiers (a Coloured woman who is of Khoi-Khoi, Xhosa and French ancestry) and he combined the families along with his friend in Grasmere and started developing the land and erecting homes from zinc and later bricks were used around 1942. 

In 1942, the Arendse family arrived in Ennerdale coming from Klipspruit headed by Mr. Freddie and his wife Margaret Arendse. 

Around this time, Ennerdale had no water, no electricity, no paved roads and a lot of people from different places were settling in, with a lot of them coming from Upington, Springbok, De Aar, Sophiatown, Kuruman, Kimberley, Strydrnburg, Victoria West and other places from the Northern Cape and Eastern Cape. 

Mr. Arendse (popularly known as oom Freddie was a bricklayer who worked as a vendor on the train, during recession in the late 1940s, he started the 'Arundal Cafe' to cater to the needs of the community, he started to homebrew African beer 

Around the 1960s the apartheid government started to take interest in the place, and planned it as a place to house Coloured people who are from Eldorado Park due to housing shortages. 

Around the 1960s there was already 150 families with the most prominent being the Fourier, Mofokeng, Smit, Van Der Merwe, Van Der Bilj, Schultz, Williams (later known as Willemse), Burgh, and others. 

CLANS OF THE PEOPLE OF ENNERDALE 

Majority of Ennerdale people classified as Coloureds trace their paternal and maternal ancestry to following clans/ethnicities:
Kxoe
Hai||om
Oorlam 
Witbooi (of Hendrik Witbooi) 
AmaNgqosini
Damara
|Khowesin
|Awakhoen
|Hõakhoena (of Tswana, Bakwena) 
|Gami¦num (Bondelswarts) 
|Kx'abakhoena (offshoot of the Bakoena people mixed with Trekboer) 
|Kharakhoen (known as the Fransman Nama) 
|Khau¦goan (Boer Basters) 
|Hawobe (known as the Special Coloureds) 
|Aonin (Topnaars) 
AmaZizi
Xiri
Xirikua (known as Griqua) 
Khwe (of Sotho) 
|Orana (of Mpondo) 
|Ora (of Gqunukhwebe) 
|Kharakhoen
Naro
Tshu-Khwe
Kxoe
|Kung (¡xuun) 
Jul'hoan
Khai||khaun (Rooi-Nation) 
!Xam
!Khomani
Nusan (Niu)
|Kxa'aoll'ae (Auen) 
Bakgalagadi (Khoi and San mixture) 
Xhosa
G|ui (¡Gwi) 
G||ana (Gana) 
Tsoa
!Nûkhoe¦haos (of Mpondo ancestry) 
Rehoboth (incorrectly known as the Basters) 
|KHaro¦oan (amper-rooi) 
|Ogain
|Aman
|Núkhoe
Tshwa
Most of these clans groupingly known as the Khoi-Khoi, the Xhosa and the San people had interracial relationships with the German, the Dutch, the French Huguenots, the Flemish, the Walloons, the Mediterranean, the Belgian Flemish, the English, the Portuguese, the Scottish, the IRISH, the Swiss and Polish, and later on Asian ancestry. 

This is the reason why it is known as the 'Land Of The Khoi-San', over the years majority of the population that originally settled in Ennerdale, have found themselves marginalized and ostracized, and in 2013-14 protested to the Department Of Housing in Region G in Ennerdale Ext9 over lack of government RDP housing, as much of the RDP housing budget was spent more on Lawley Extension 2 to cater for the Black African population who are more likely to support the ruling ANC who came in this area around the mid 1990s.

Around the 1970s at the very height of the National Party's Apartheid, Ennerdale was declared a Coloured area under the Group Areas Act. 

Around 1983 Fred Norman School was built, a year later the SOS Children's Village began their work in Ennerdale. 

Prominent founding members of the town are still in the suburb with their siblings and their offspring making it very much a family oriented suburb.

The suburb has been growing and expanding over the years to what it is today. Properties have of course changed with time and demand and most have kept pace with architectural trends and also the desire for larger homes have been catered for which has added value to the overall property value in the suburb.

Today Ennerdale has Extensions found in two wards. 
WARD 7
Extension 1, Extension 2, Extension 3, Extension 6, Extension 10, Extension 11, Extension 12, Extension 13, Extension 14, all found in Ward 7 which also has Meriting and Finetown townships. 

WARD 121 
Lawley 1, Lawley Estates (Known as Lawley 2) which has 10 Extensions, Kapook, Ennerdale Extension 4 (newly built), Ennerdale Extension 5, Ennerdale Extension 8, Ennerdale Extension 9 (with Small9), Lakeview, Hiltonia & Hopefield

The Main Streets
Town, Olivien, Cryolite, R558, Percy, Olympus, Katz, The Avenues, Stalagmite, Samuel, The Agaats, Charles, James, Wulfenite, Wellington , Carina, Poseidon and others. 

With a suburb of this size all the amenities had to be catered for like schools and community centers and infrastructure like roads and commercial districts.

Around the 1970s to 1980s the Apartheid government decided, and went ahead with their plans and placed Coloured people from Eldorado Park and a few from Westbury, Bosmont and Riverlea. Even today some Ennerdale Coloureds have families around those places. 

Ennerdale offers many secondary and primary schools to choose from for the residents, include: Mid Ennerdale Primary School, Daleview Secondary School, Ennerdale Secondary School, Fred Norman Secondary School.

During the 1980s Ennerdale had a successful and substantial economy for the locals to serve the community, and the had small malls had also been catered for, however various local businesses have since closed and are rented to Asian immigrants as Cafés and Spaza Shops. 

Around the 2010s there has been a gradual development with many to choose from. Some of the shops in the vicinity include:Shoprite Checkers, Shoprite Liquor, Debonairs, Imraan's Fast Food, Scotts Bottlestore, Cash Build, Spar (now Four), PEP, Ackermans, Team Tish Bottlestore, 2 ABSA ATM, 1 Nedbank ATM, 2 Capitec ATM, 1 FNB ATM, 1 Standard Bank ATM, Engen Garage, BP Garage

It is has Extensions 1 to 14. With nearing other places such as Kapook, Hopefield, Hiltonia, Lakeview, Mountainview, Daxiba, Lenasia South and Kokotela (Cocktail). 

The advantage of the location of Ennerdale is its proximity to surrounding towns and suburbs such as Lawley 1, Lenasia, Eldorado Park, Soweto, De Deur, Orange Farm and the other major Johannesburg South suburbs and industrial hubs that make it a very convenient suburb to live in.

Back in those days Ennerdale boasted many, big families, amongst them:
the Banks
the Watson
the Seboko
the Lebatie
the Schultz
the Arendse
the Diedericks (originally Diedrich) 
the Swartz (also Swarts) 
the Jacobs 
the Dickson

Ennerdale, lacked the most important commodities to survive, like water, electric and sewage. It took determination and survival instinct to survive in this area, which our pioneers possessed.

After “Oom FREDDIE” ENNERDALIANS came in their droves and were quite unusual people too. Amongst them was. “Duimpie” a pint sized man with a reddish moustache that lived with the GRAY family on Mr. Damon's property. Mr. Mike Peters, a talented pianist who’s abnormal nonsense banter and actions, was nothing compared to what he achieved on the piano. He was an accomplished musician that could well have matched the abilities of starts such as Liberace… referring to his virtuoso, and not “monetary or jeweled” skills. 

Oom Freddie moved to the railway side ad the success of his business grew, he was also the first person to sell beer in Ennerdale, he also started to sell mageu (processesd maas), due to laws, he was only allowed to operate his business from 8am to 5am and to 1pm in the weekends. 
In the morning he'd sell coffee and fat cakes to train commuters at the Ennerdale Train Station. 

The Arendse family ten children, one of who passed away, Mr. Ernst Rutherford who was very well known in Ennerdale is a brother to Mrs. Arendse, he was known for his ability to walk from Ennerdale to Klipspruit while smoking his pipe of tobacco. 

The Arendse family had a daughter by the name of Ettie, also known for her community service. Reginald, the eldest son of Mr. Arendse and Freddie Jr. served at the train station working as guards to provide security to the people of Ennerdale, and also followed in their business footsteps of their father. 

Reginald moved to Zambia (known as Northern Rhodesia) in 1962, and returned to work in Pietermaritzburg (a town in KwaZulu-Natal named after Piet Retief and Gert Maritz) to be a principal, along with Mr. J. M. Diedericks, they then went to Eshowe which is the oldest gwon of  European settlement in Zululand, Mr. Diedericks became principal there in 1979.

The Arendse family is blessed in the academic field, both Reginald and his brother served as principals, while also another daughter Edna was a teacher, Leon was a deputy principal in Port Elizabeth (now Gqeberha), Reginald's son and daughter are both qualified in the medical field and live and work in Cape Town. 

Reginald was also a temporary principal at Fred Norman School found between Poseidon and Samuel road, in Extension 3, other principals of the school include Mr. & Mrs. Davy. 

David Prince and James Minnaar were the first of teachers in Ennerdale, also from that era includes children from the Diedericks, the POP, the Pitt families. 

Around 1960s poverty hit Ennerdale and the growing of marog (wild plant eaten with pap) was rife, those of Khoikhoi and San taught others how to plough it. 

Majority of Blacks started to flock in around 1995, who are predominantly Xhosa, Sotho and Venda, and foreigners from Mozambique. 

While Mr. Kosie Jacobs could spear a rabbit with a crowbar, Mr. Katts was a master marksman with the normal slingshot or “Kettie” as it was commonly known. The fact is, it was through Mr. Katts' accurate shooting that saved Mr. Dickson from dogs that attacked him and severed his arm in the process. Dickson road in Extension 9 is named after him, and most of the residents of Extension 9 have Grassie surnames. 

There was Mr. Wolseley who was a specialist in herbal cures, learned from his Khoi-Khoi or San great-grandmother.

Mr. Willem Stigling “Oom Willem” talked about his family who were originally from the Northern Cape where Mr. Jan and Mrs. Mieta Stigling were born.

After having moved from the Northern Cape to Heidelberg and a dozen other areas, they eventually settled in Mid-Ennerdale. 

The best thing that Mr. Stigling remembers of the first time they came here was the freedom and safety whenever he walked in Ennerdale. Visiting friends late at night. you could do so with no problem except that you had to know where you walking, it was dark here in those years, no electricity and you had to watch out for barbed wire fences in the area.  “Hell, only last week I heard of two packers from Shoprite who were robbed on their way back early evening. But in those years, nobody bothered anyone. Even then, the so called gangsters had a certain degree of respect”.

“Grassie ” as it was known, like any other township. The only difference was, the fact that its pioneers etched out an existence from nothing… without any facilities or council help. 

Only after a few hundred families have settled here, did the Council decide to help develop Mid-Ennerdale to the mega township it is today!

Today Ennerdale is 35% Coloured, 65% Black, 0.7 Other, 0.6% Asian, 0.1% White. With:
"Afrikaans, English, Johannesburg Zulu , Sotho being the most spoken languages".

Over the years Ennerdale has faced a lot of problems from unemployment, being far from development, growinh gangsterism, poverty, lack of housing, electricity and water supply shortages, land Invasions, food for sex situations, inability to pay bonds, depreciatinh infrastructure, in division and lack of service delivery, in short Ennerdale is forgotten in the City of Johannesburg Metropolitan Municipality. 

SCHOOL TIME 
Seeing the Ennerdale school kids of today walking smiling and playing while going to their different schools on the Mid-Ennerdale Avenues, I don’t think “Oupa Freddie Smith” knew that he would eventually lead a foundation of what Ennerdale is today. 

When he decided to move has family to Mid-Ennerdale back in the early 1940’s.  What a long way we have come…”back in the days”… The lack of a school for children in Ennerdale back in 1941 was a sleepless concern to the parents. It had to take some hard working folks like, Mr. J. D. Smith, Mr. Dixon, Mrs. L. Prince and Ms. A Smith then approached the then West Rand Education Department with the request to have a school established here, on our mother land “Grassie” as it was known back in the day.

They were told by the Department, a school could only be established once there were forty pupils to attend. This presented the community with a predicament as there were not sufficient children to comply with this minimum requirement.  

However, this hurdle was not going to damper the determination of the community to have a place of learning for their children.

After persistent efforts, Mrs Louisa Prince , was granted permission to start a “private school” until such time as the necessary quota of forty children was achieved. 

Faced with a shortage of qualified teachers, The school was nevertheless, started in February 1942, with the volunteer services of Mrs Louisa Prince and Ms Anne Smith.

References

Bibliography 
Lupton, Malcolm H. (1993) Ennerdale New Town, South Africa: The Social Limits to Urban Design. GeoJournal 30 (1): 37-44. 

Lupton, Malcolm H. (1993) Collective Consumption and Urban Segregation in South Africa: The Case of Two Colored Suburbs in the Johannesburg Region, Antipode 25(1): 32–50.

Johannesburg Region G